Good Morning, Judge is a 1928 American silent comedy film directed by William A. Seiter and starring Reginald Denny, Mary Nolan and Otis Harlan.

Plot

Cast
 Reginald Denny as Freddie Grey  
 Mary Nolan as Julia Harrington 
 Otis Harlan as Jerry Snoot  
 Dorothy Gulliver as Ruth Grey  
 William B. Davidson as Elton (as William Davidson)  
 Bull Montana as First Crook  
 William Worthington as Mr. Grey Sr  
 Sailor Sharkey as Second Crook  
 Charles Coleman as Butler  
 William H. Tooker as Judge

References

Bibliography
 Munden, Kenneth White. The American Film Institute Catalog of Motion Pictures Produced in the United States, Part 1. University of California Press, 1997.

External links

1928 films
1928 comedy films
Silent American comedy films
Films directed by William A. Seiter
American silent feature films
1920s English-language films
Universal Pictures films
American black-and-white films
Films with screenplays by Joseph F. Poland
1920s American films